Death in the Steel City is a crime novel by the American writer Thomas Lipinski set in 1990s Pittsburgh, Pennsylvania.

It tells the story of Pittsburgh private detective Carroll Dorsey, who is hired by an aging Jewish gangster to track an old mistress of his, a black woman. In a subplot, Dorsey's father, a powerful Pittsburgh political boss, is on his deathbed.

The novel is the fourth in a series of four Carroll Dorsey mysteries.

Sources
Contemporary Authors Online. The Gale Group, 2006.

External links
  Book Page @ Amazon.com

2000 American novels
American crime novels
Novels set in Pittsburgh